The Pittsburgh left is a colloquial term for the driving practice of the first left-turning vehicle taking precedence over vehicles going straight through an intersection, associated with the Pittsburgh, Pennsylvania, area.  In other locales, the practice is also referred to as a Boston left or New York left. It is a potentially illegal and controversial practice.

Description
The Pittsburgh left involves two cars facing one another waiting at a traffic light (which lacks a protected turn) or other stop signal: one turning left and one going straight. The left-turning car will anticipate the green light, although ideally not actually entering the intersection on the red.

As the light turns green, the left-turning car will rapidly proceed left ahead of the opposing traffic, frequently with the signaled assent of the opposing traffic. By accepting a modest delay in going straight, the opposing traffic has saved the left-turning traffic waiting an entire light cycle to turn left, as well as saved an equivalent amount of time for all the cars that otherwise would have been stuck behind the left-turning car.  In situations where there is so much oncoming, straight traffic that a left turn would not be otherwise possible during any part of the light cycle, the Pittsburgh left can allow a line of left turning traffic to proceed incrementally, potentially avoiding a gridlock situation.

Frequently, the on-coming cars will accelerate slowly enough to allow the turn to be completed without anyone slowing down or being delayed at all.  This means that a "Pittsburgh left" can, in places other than Pittsburgh, be the equivalent of simply judging the oncoming traffic to be slow and distant enough to turn in front of it: something that in and of itself is not illegal.

Signals
Generally, a wave of the hand in the direction of the turn or a flashing of headlights by the driver going straight will indicate permission for the left-turning driver to execute the turn. Conversely, the driver navigating the turn may attempt to signal the other driver for permission to do so, with similar hand motions or headlight signals.  Furthermore, simply a delay by the straight-bound car can often initiate the signal, and give the left turner time to go and make the turn, especially in large intersections.

Legality
The Pittsburgh left has no basis in law.  Failing to yield to oncoming traffic while navigating a turn is a traffic violation, and is prohibited in the Commonwealth of Pennsylvania.  

At certain intersections, left-turning traffic may be given precedence over straight-moving traffic in a regulated (and thus legal) manner, via the use of protected turn signaling.

In Ontario, Canada, such a turn is considered stunt driving under the provincial Highway Traffic Act.

Origin
Many of Pittsburgh's roads are narrow streets with only a single lane in each direction, and most intersections lacking left-turn-only lanes. If a car is attempting to turn left, no other cars behind it can proceed through the intersection. Allowing the left-turning car to proceed first through the intersection gives that driver a chance to get out of others' way, allowing for smoother flow.

See also
Pittsburgh parking chair
Michigan left

References

Hazardous motor vehicle activities
Culture of Pittsburgh
Driving techniques